In enzymology, a polysialic-acid O-acetyltransferase is an enzyme that catalyzes the chemical reaction

acetyl-CoA + an alpha-2,8-linked polymer of sialic acid  CoA + polysialic acid acetylated on O-7 or O-9

Thus, the two substrates of this enzyme are acetyl-CoA and alpha-2,8-linked polymer of sialic acid, whereas its 3 products are CoA, polysialic acid acetylated on O-7, and polysialic acid acetylated on O-9.

This enzyme belongs to the family of transferases, specifically those acyltransferases transferring groups other than aminoacyl groups.  The systematic name of this enzyme class is acetyl-CoA:polysialic-acid O-acetyltransferase. Other names in common use include lecithin:retinol acyltransferase, lecithin-retinol acyltransferase, retinyl ester synthase, LRAT, and lecithin retinol acyl transferase.

References

 

EC 2.3.1
Enzymes of unknown structure